Beyond Unbroken is an American rock band formed by former Escape the Fate members Monte and Michael Money in 2013. The band released its debut EP "Don't Wake the Dead" in 2017. The band's debut album "Running Out of Time" was released in 2020.

History

Formation (2013–2015)
After leaving Escape the Fate, Monte and his brother Michael started a new solo project called Money Brothers. They only released two singles "Break Free" was released in October 2013, and "Clarity (Behind the Curtain)" in February 2014.

The Money's revealed "Money Brothers" would be put on hold indefinitely to focus on a new project. "Beyond Unbroken" was created shortly after joined by Daimen Horrell as the official bassist, and Matti Hoffman as the official lead guitarist.

Recent works (2015–present)
On October 30, 2015, their first single titled "Under Your Skin" was released.

On February 22, 2016, the single "Dont Wake the Dead" was released. in “Don't Wake the Dead,” the lyrics “fuck your fate” could be read as an insult to Escape the Fate. However, Monte says that's not the case. “The song lyric has nothing to do toward the Escape the Fate band. That lyric in that particular song means fate is irrelevant to those who strongly believe in destiny.” On March 30, 2016, The band released their first music video for the single "Losing My Mind" debuting on Alternative Press.

On August 29, 2017, the band released a new single entitled "Overdose" accompanied by an animated video. with the release of the video it was also announced Matti Hoffman had left the band as a full time member to pursue other musical endeavors, but would be joining the band for their "Blackout The Sun Tour". On September 1, 2017, the band's debut EP "Don't Wake the Dead" was released. This EP was produced by Matt Good.

On August 17, 2018, the band released their final video off the "Don't Wake the Dead" EP for the song "Memories".

In December, 2019, the band parted ways with Daimen Horrell due to creative differences.

On February 7, 2020, the band released two singles titled "Enemy" and "In My Head". On April 3, 2020, the band's debut album "Running Out of Time" was released. On April 29, 2020, the band covered Lil Peep and Twenty One Pilots mashup, "Falling Down + Heathens".

On June 10, 2021, the band released the single titled "Silver Spoon". On July 14, 2021, the band released the single "With or Without Me". On December 14, 2021, the band released an acoustic version of "Memories".

Band members 

Current
 Monte Money – vocals, guitar (2013–present), drums (2013–2015; 2019–present; studio only), bass (2013–2015; 2019–present; studio only)
 Michael Money – guitar, unclean vocals (2013–present)
Former
 Zach Snell – drums (2015–2016)
 Matti Hoffman – guitar (2015–2017), touring (2017) 
 Cameron Daly – drums (2017–2018)
 Daimen Horrell – bass, backing vocals (2015–2019), drums (2015–2017; studio only)

Timeline

Discography

EPs
 Don't Wake the Dead (2017)

Studio albums
 Running Out of Time (2020)

Music videos

References

External links

Musical groups established in 2013
2013 establishments in Nevada
American post-hardcore musical groups
Metalcore musical groups from Nevada
Rock music groups from Nevada
Musical groups from Las Vegas